Hibbertia marrawalina is a species of flowering plant in the family Dilleniaceae and is endemic to a restricted part of the Northern Territory. It is a shrublet with scaly foliage, wiry branches, narrow linear leaves, and yellow flowers arranged singly in leaf axils with fifteen to eighteen stamens and about seven staminodes arranged in bundles around two scaly carpels.

Description
Flowering occurs in April.

Taxonomy
Hibbertia marrawalina was first formally described in 2010 by Hellmut R. Toelken in the Journal of the Adelaide Botanic Gardens from specimens collected in Nitmiluk National Park in 2002. The specific epithet (marrawalina) means "belonging to the Marrawal Plateau", where this species is apparently endemic.

Distribution and habitat
This hibbertia grows in tall woodland in sandy soil on the Marrawal Plateau on the boundary of the Kakadu and Nitmiluk National Parks in the northern part of the Northern Territory.

Conservation status
Hibbertia marrawalina is classified as "data deficient" under the Territory Parks and Wildlife Conservation Act 1976.

See also
List of Hibbertia species

References

marrawalina
Flora of the Northern Territory
Plants described in 2010
Taxa named by Hellmut R. Toelken